The ghijak (also spelled ghidjak, ghichak, gidzhak, gijak, g'ijjak,, or ghijek (or occasionally ; Chinese: 艾捷克 aijieke or 吉孜哈克 jizihake), is a group of related spike fiddles, used by Afghans, Uzbeks, Uyghurs, Tajiks, Turkmens, Qaraqalpaks and in the Xinjiang province of western China. Despite the similarity of the name, it is more closely related to the Persian kamancheh than the ghaychak.

History

The instrument name appears in 10th-century manuscripts, which indicate that the bridge (harrak) was made of almond shells. The ghidjak as depicted in 15th-century Persian miniatures resembles the modern instrument in its construction.

Xinjiang
The ghijek as it is used in Xinjiang has four strings, either with a bowl soundbox (similar to the kamancheh), or with a box soundbox often made from a tin can. One of Xinjiang's most prominent ghijek players is Akram Omar (艾克热木·吾买尔 / ئەكرەم ئۆمەر / Акрам Омар), from Kashgar.video

See also 
kamancheh

References

External links
Afghan ghaychak (box lute)
Tajik ghijak (box lute 

Chinese musical instruments
Culture in Xinjiang
Kazakhstani musical instruments
Kyrgyz musical instruments
Afghan musical instruments
Uzbekistani musical instruments
Tajik musical instruments
Turkmen musical instruments